Tse Ka Wing (born 4 September 1999, in Hong Kong)  is a Hong Kong professional footballer who currently plays for Hong Kong Premier League club Tai Po.

Youth career
Tse was born in Hong Kong and at an early age, played football streets with his father. In 2012, he joined Chelsea Soccer School where he trained under the tutelage of Shum Kwok Pui and participated in various tournaments in Spain and the Mediterranean, eventually earning him a call up to the Hong Kong's U-16 team. At a regional youth tournament organized by Manchester United, Tse's performances attracted the attention of Shandong Luneng's chairman who offered him the opportunity to join the club. He later declined the offer.

In March 2016, Tse and his Chelsea School teammate Jordan Lam went on trial at Leicester City. They later went on trial at Bury where they both join the Shakers's academy for the 2016–17 season. However, neither player were granted work permits to play in England and thus both players left Bury at the end of 2016 without ever appearing in a youth match.

Club career

Rangers
On 27 January 2017, Tse signed his first professional contract with Rangers. He made his debut as a substitute on 6 May 2017, coming off the bench in the 83rd minute in a game against R&F.

Dreams FC
On 10 June 2017, Tse left Rangers to sign with Dreams FC.

R&F
On 19 June 2019, R&F head coach Yeung Ching Kwong revealed that Tse would join the club. He was officially announced as an R&F player on 9 July 2019. On 14 October 2020, Tse left the club after his club's withdrawal from the HKPL in the new season.

Happy Valley
On 6 February 2021, Tse signed with Happy Valley.

Tai Po
On 8 August 2022, Tse joined Tai Po.

International career
In October 2014, Tse earned a call up to the Hong Kong U-16's for the 2014 AFC U-16 Championship.

References

External links
Tse Ka Wing at HKFA

1999 births
Living people
Hong Kong people
Hong Kong footballers
Hong Kong Premier League players
Hong Kong Rangers FC players
HK U23 Football Team players
Dreams Sports Club players
R&F (Hong Kong) players
Happy Valley AA players
Tai Po FC players
Association football goalkeepers